The 2019 WSG Open was a professional tennis tournament played on outdoor clay courts. It was the third edition of the tournament which was part of the 2019 ITF Women's World Tennis Tour. It took place in Warsaw, Poland between 5 and 11 August 2019.

Singles main-draw entrants

Seeds

 1 Rankings are as of 29 July 2019.

Other entrants
The following players received wildcards into the singles main draw:
  Paula Kania
  Johana Marková
  Stefania Rogozińska Dzik
  Zuzanna Szczepańska

The following players received entry from the qualifying draw:
  Maryna Chernyshova
  Nicoleta Dascălu
  Anastasia Dețiuc
  Andreea Ghițescu
  Vivien Juhászová
  Camilla Rosatello
  Anastasiya Shoshyna
  Iryna Shymanovich

Champions

Singles

 Maja Chwalińska def.  Anastasiya Komardina, 6–3, 6–0

Doubles

 Maja Chwalińska /  Ulrikke Eikeri def.  Weronika Falkowska /  Martyna Kubka, 6–4, 6–1

References

External links
 2019 WSG Open at ITFtennis.com
 Official website

2019 ITF Women's World Tennis Tour
2019 in Polish tennis
2019 in Polish women's sport
WSG Open